Faustina Namutenya Caley (born 17 November 1956) is a Namibian politician. A member of SWAPO, Caley joined parliament in 2015 and was appointed deputy Minister of Education, Arts and Culture in 2020.

Early life and professional career
Faustina Caley was born on 17 November 1956, in Ruurumwe, Kavango West, and grew up at Sarusungu now known as Kaisosi, in Kavango East. She started her primary school in Kavango Region and finished her grade 12 at Rundu Secondary School. Caley attended Augustineum Training College and graduated with a social worker certificate in 1979. She worked as a social worker for government until 1983.

In 1990, she became acting principal of Dr Romanus Kampungu Secondary School in Rundu. From 1991 Caley worked for the Ministry of Education in various positions until 2014, rising to director of education of Otjozondjupa Region. In parallel she obtained various tertiary degrees, a diploma in Primary Education from the University of Namibia (1997), a Bachelor of Philosophy from the University of Hull, United Kingdom (1998), a Masters in Education (M.Ed) from University of Manchester (1999), and a postgraduate diploma in Management Studies from MANCOSA, South Africa (2003).

Political career 
Caley became a SWAPO member of the National Assembly in 2015 and served as the chairperson of the Parliamentary standing committee on ICT and Innovation. For the 2020–2025 legislative period she was appointed deputy minister of Basic Education, Arts and Culture.

Reference 

Women members of the National Assembly (Namibia)
21st-century Namibian women politicians
SWAPO politicians
Members of the National Assembly (Namibia)
1956 births
Alumni of the University of Manchester
Alumni of the University of Hull
University of Namibia alumni
Management College of Southern Africa alumni
21st-century Namibian politicians
People from Kavango West
Living people